A rishama (rišama; riš-ama) or rishema is a religious patriarch in Mandaeism. It is the highest rank out of all the Mandaean clergical ranks. The next ranks are the ganzibra and tarmida priests (see Mandaean priest).

In Iraq, the current rishama is Sattar Jabbar Hilo. In Australia, the Rishama and head of the Mandaean community is Salah Choheili.

Notable rishama or patriarchs
Anush bar Danqa, the leader of the Mandaeans, who appeared before Muslim authorities at the beginning of the Muslim conquest of Mesopotamia
Yahya Bihram, who revived the entire Mandaean priesthood during the 1830s
Sattar Jabbar Hilo, the current Mandaean patriarch in Iraq
Dakhil Aidan, patriarch from 1917 to 1964 in Iraq
Jabbar Choheili (d. 2014), rishama in Iran
Salah Choheili, the current rishama and head of the Mandaean community in Australia
Zazai d-Gawazta bar Hawa, patriarch datable to around the year 270 CE and earliest known copyist of Alma Rišaia Zuṭa, Qolasta, The Thousand and Twelve Questions, The Baptism of Hibil Ziwa, Scroll of Exalted Kingship and The Wedding of the Great Šišlam. The Ginza Rabba, however, predates Zazai's time.

See also
 Chief Rabbi
 Kohanim
 Nasoraeans
 Samaritan High Priest
 Archbishop

References

External links
The Worlds of Mandaean Priests

Mandaic words and phrases
Mandaean titles